Phujtir Pata Punta (Aymara phujtiri a kind of woven shoulder cloth, pata step, Spanish punta point, also spelled Pujtirpata Punta) is a  mountain in the Chilla-Kimsa Chata mountain range in the Andes of Bolivia. It lies in the La Paz Department, Ingavi Province, Jesús de Machaca Municipality, and in the Los Andes Province, Laja Municipality. Phujtir Pata Punta is situated south-east of the mountain Asir Kunka.

References 

Mountains of La Paz Department (Bolivia)